Slam Dance (Slam Dance – ) is a 2017 Thai television series starring Pimchanok Luevisadpaibul (Baifern), Chutavuth Pattarakampol (March) and Purim Rattanaruangwattana (Pluem).

Produced by GMMTV together with Studio Commuan, the series was one of the six television series for 2017 showcased by GMMTV in their "6 Natures+" event on 2 March 2017. It premiered on One31 and LINE TV on 13 May 2017, airing on Saturdays at 22:00 ICT and 23:00 ICT, respectively. The series concluded on 5 August 2017 and was rerun on GMM 25 last 2019.

Cast and characters 
Below are the cast of the series:

Main 
 Pimchanok Luevisadpaibul (Baifern) as Fang
 Chutavuth Pattarakampol (March) as Singh
 Purim Rattanaruangwattana (Pluem) as Ryu

Supporting 
 Ployshompoo Supasap (Jan) as Praemai
 Sivakorn Lertchuchot (Guy) as Bas
 Raisarat Prinee (Preen) as Namfon
 Kornrawich Sungkibool (Q) as Junior
 Korn Khunatipapisiri (Oaujun) as Ken
 Tipnaree Weerawatnodom (Namtan) as Woon
 Pattadon Janngeon (Fiat) as Graph
 Harit Cheewagaroon (Sing) as Nick
 Sattabut Laedeke (Drake) as Pob

References

External links 
 Slam Dance on GMM 25 website 
 GMMTV

Television series by GMMTV
Thai romance television series
Thai drama television series
2017 Thai television series debuts
2017 Thai television series endings
One 31 original programming